Lenient Obia (born 1 August 1977) is a Nigerian former swimmer, who specialized in backstroke events. Obia qualified for the women's 100 m backstroke at the 2004 Summer Olympics in Athens, by receiving a Universality place from FINA, in an entry time of 1:09.69. She topped the first heat against Honduras' Ana Galindo and Turkmenistan's Yelena Rojkova in 1:09.95, just 0.26 of a second off her entry time. Obia failed to advance into the semifinals, as she placed thirty-ninth overall in the preliminaries.

References

1977 births
Living people
Nigerian female swimmers
Olympic swimmers of Nigeria
Swimmers at the 2004 Summer Olympics
Female backstroke swimmers